Christopher of Denmark – Danish: Christoffer - may refer to:
Christopher I of Denmark
Christopher II of Denmark
Christopher III of Denmark, better known as Christopher of Bavaria
Christopher, Duke of Lolland
Prince Christopher of Greece and Denmark
Christopher, Duke of Schleswig, illegitimate son Valdemar I of Denmark
Christopher Eriksen, son of Eric IV of Denmark who died young